Ystrad Aeron is a small village west of Felinfach on the A482 between Lampeter and Aberaeron, Ceredigion, Wales. It is part of the constituent community of Llanfihangel Ystrad.

Facilities
The church, St Michael's, is in the centre of  Ystrad Aeron. It survived as a medieval church until 1877, when it was entirely  rebuilt.  
Theatr Felinfach is located just outside the village, as is the Felin Fach Creamery.

Other facilities in the village include a garage, a shop, a farmers’ co-op, a caravan park, and a pub, The Vale of Aeron. Neuadd Goffa Felinfach Memorial Hall serves both Ystrad Aeron and Felinfach villages.

The Lampeter, Aberayron and New Quay Light Railway line ran through the village. Felin Fach railway station closed in 1951 to passenger services. Initially it was named Ystrad. General freight ceased in 1963, and milk traffic in 1973.

Dylan Thomas

The Vale of Aeron pub was frequented by Dylan Thomas and his wife, Caitlin Thomas, when they lived at Plas Gelli in nearby Talsarn in the early 1940s. The landlord then was Thomas Vaughan, whose son has described how Dylan and Caitlin used to walk across the fields to visit the pub. Dylan and Caitlin’s Pub Walk: Talsarn to Ystrad Aeron is published in the Dylan Thomas Trail.

John Davies
The bookbinder and poet, John Davies  (Shôn Dafydd y Crydd) 1722–1799, is buried in St Michael's graveyard. His grave is directly behind the wooden bench by the church door. The inscription on the grave reads:

"Beneath this stone lies John alone

Cordwainer, scribe, Musician,

Poet sublime in blank and Rhime,

Devine and Politician."

John Davies’ diary with poems for  1 January 1796 to 19 December 1799 is in the National Library of Wales. It is available online.  There is also a summary of its contents available, as well as two newspaper reports  and a journal article.

References

External links
www.geograph.co.uk : photos of Ystrad Aeron and surrounding area
Theatre Felinfach website 
Ystrad Aeron War Memorials 
 Neuadd Goffa Felinfach Memorial Hall

Villages in Ceredigion